Wings of the Hawk is a 1953 3-D American Western film directed by Budd Boetticher and starring Van Heflin and Julie Adams. It is set during the Mexican Revolution.

Plot

Mexico, 1911: An expatriate American known as "Irish" Gallagher joins up with Mexican revolutionaries when the mine where he and partner Marco have just struck gold is seized by Colonel Paco Ruiz, a corrupt official who rules the province. Marco is killed by Ruiz.

A band of rebels saves Irish from certain death, with a particularly brave one, a woman, Raquel Noriega, being wounded by gunfire. The rebels aren't sure about Irish so they take him back to their leader, Arturo Torres. As they talk, Raquel faints from her injury, and Irish offers to remove the bullet.

Raquel is engaged to marry Arturo. Her sister Elena has been kidnapped. When they go search for the sister, Raquel and Irish are taken prisoner by Ruiz and locked in a cell. Elena is not a captive after all and says she intends to marry Ruiz. She mistakenly trusts the villainous Ruiz, who coldly executes the mother of one of Arturo's loyal rebels, Tomas.

Irish and Raquel are broken out of jail by the rebels, but Arturo is killed. Irish, realizing how much Ruiz values the gold in the mine, booby-traps it with dynamite and sets off the explosions while Tomas kills Ruiz to avenge his mother's death. When asked by Raquel why he destroyed his own mine, Irish says there is something he loves more, and they kiss.

Cast
 Van Heflin as Irish Gallagher
 Julie Adams as Raquel Noriega (as Julia Adams)
 Abbe Lane as Elena Noriega
 George Dolenz as Col. Paco Ruiz
 Noah Beery Jr. as Pasquel Orozco (as Noah Berry) 
 Rodolfo Acosta as Arturo Torres
 Antonio Moreno as Father Perez
 Pedro Gonzalez as Tomas
 Paul Fierro as Carlos
 Mario Siletti as Marco
 Rico Alaniz as Capt. Gomez

Reception
Although initially released in 3-D, due to waning popularity of the process, the film was offered in 2-D as well after just one month of release.

References

External links
 
 
 

1953 films
1953 Western (genre) films
American 3D films
1953 3D films
American Western (genre) films
Mexican Revolution films
Films scored by Frank Skinner
Universal Pictures films
Films directed by Budd Boetticher
1950s English-language films
1950s American films